Pillotina calotermitidis is a species of spirochete that is symbiotic in wood-eating cockroaches and termites, the type species of its genus.

References

Further reading

Margulis, Lynn, and Gregory Hinkle. "Large symbiotic spirochetes: Clevelandina, Cristispira, Diplocalyx, Hollandina, and Pillotina." The prokaryotes. Springer New York, 1992. 3965–3978.

External links
LPSN

Spirochaetes
Bacteria described in 1988